The Tobago Council of the People's National Movement (PNM), also known as the Tobago Council of the PNM, PNM Tobago or PNM Tobago Council is the longest-serving and oldest active  political party in Tobago. The party is the autonomous branch of the Trinidad and Tobago People's National Movement operating in Tobago. While its political leader acts in the local capacity, they also serve as a deputy leader on a national level. The party's executives organize for both local and national election campaigns. There have been three PNM Chief Secretaries and administrations.

Founded in 1998, it is the largest and most successful political party in modern Tobagonian politics. With the exception of 2010, the party has won the biggest share of the vote at the Trinidad and Tobago general elections since 2000 and has governed the Tobago House of Assembly uninterruptedly, winning every Tobago House of Assembly election from 2001 until 2021.

The Tobago PNM currently hold 2 of 2 Tobagonian seats in the Trinidad and Tobago Parliament and 1 of 15 seats in the Tobago House of Assembly (THA). Former Chief Secretary Ancil Dennis is the current and youngest political leader of the PNM after being elected unopposed in the 2020 People's National Movement Tobago leadership election with Kelvon Morris, the party's lone elected assemblymember serving as the party's leader in the THA.

With its predecessor organizations and despite not being a socialist party, it was a member of the democratic socialist West Indies Federal Labour Party in the Federal Parliament of the West Indies Federation from 1957 to 1962, winning the Tobago seat in the 1958 elections.

As of January 2020, the party has roughly 10,000 registered members.

Elected representatives (current)

Parliament of Trinidad and Tobago 
Members of the House of Representatives since the 7 September 2015 general election:

Members of the Senate

Tobago House of Assembly

Notable party members

Electoral performance

West Indies

Trinidad and Tobago general elections

Tobago County Council

Tobago House of Assembly

Leaders 
The leaders of the People's National Movement Tobago Council who additionally serve as deputy leaders of the party nationally have been as follows (any acting leaders indicated in italics):

Key:

MaL: Majority Leader
MiL: Minority Leader

Executive positions 
These are the positions currently held by the Executive of the PNM Tobago Council:

External links 
Official website
 Facebook page
 Facebook group
 Instagram account
 Tobago Council website (defunct)

See also 
 People's National Movement
 2020 Tobago Council of the People's National Movement leadership election
 Chief Secretary of Tobago
 Presiding Officer of the Tobago House of Assembly
2022 People's National Movement leadership election
 List of political parties in Trinidad and Tobago

Notes 

Political parties established in 1998
Liberal parties in North America
Political parties in Trinidad and Tobago
Social liberal parties
Tobago
Tobago portal
1998 establishments in Trinidad and Tobago
1998 in Trinidad and Tobago